Qadamgah (also Romanized as Qadamgāh) is a village in Mazayjan Rural District, in the Central District of Bavanat County, Fars Province, Iran. At the 2006 census, its population was 86, in 25 families.

References 

Populated places in Bavanat County